The 2021–22 2. Frauen-Bundesliga was the 18th season of Germany's second-tier women's football league, and the fourth as a single-division league. The season began on 15 August 2021 and concluded on 5 June 2022. The champions and runners-up will be promoted to the Frauen-Bundesliga, while the bottom three teams will be relegated to the Frauen-Regionalliga.

The fixtures were announced on 23 July 2021.

Teams

Team changes

Stadiums

League table

Results

Top scorers

Notes

References

External links

2021–22
2021–22 in German women's football leagues